Vladislav Valiev (born 25 April 1993) is a Russian freestyle wrestler. He won the gold medal in the men's freestyle 86 kg event at the 2019 European Wrestling Championships held in Bucharest, Romania. He also won one of the bronze medals at the 2017 World Wrestling Championships held in Paris, France.

Career 

In 2015, he competed in the 86 kg event at the Russian National Freestyle Wrestling Championships without winning a medal.

He won one of the bronze medals in the men's freestyle 86 kg event at the 2016 Russian National Freestyle Wrestling Championships held in Yakutsk, Sakha-Yakutia, Russia.

The following year, he won one of the bronze medals in the men's freestyle 86 kg event at the Golden Grand Prix Ivan Yarygin 2017 held in Krasnoyarsk, Russia. Later in 2017, he won the gold medal in the men's freestyle 86 kg event at the 2017 Russian National Freestyle Wrestling Championships held in Nazran, Ingushetia, Russia.

Major results

References

External links 
 

Living people
1993 births
Place of birth missing (living people)
Russian male sport wrestlers
World Wrestling Championships medalists
European Wrestling Championships medalists
21st-century Russian people